Alias Nick Beal  is a 1949 American film noir mystery film retelling of the Faust myth directed by John Farrow and starring Ray Milland, Audrey Totter and Thomas Mitchell (although third-billed, Mitchell plays the leading role). The picture is also known as Dark Circle, Strange Temptation and Alias Nicky Beal.

Plot
Joseph Foster (Thomas Mitchell) an honest district attorney wants to run for governor in order to clean up the criminal underworld but can't catch their leader Frankie Faulkner (Fred Clark) no matter how hard he tries. One day a smooth talking stranger named Nick Beal (Ray Milland) visits him at a café beside the docks and he makes a deal with him. Joseph begins his rise to power in the company of prostitute Donna Allen (Audrey Totter) who is sent by Nick to seduce him. But he gets out of his contract with the help of his loving wife Martha, (Geraldine Wall) and  
his friend Reverend Thomas Garfield (George Macready).

Cast
 Ray Milland as Nick Beal  
 Audrey Totter as Donna Allen
 Thomas Mitchell as Joseph Foster
 George Macready as Reverend Thomas Garfield
 Fred Clark as Frankie Faulkner
 Geraldine Wall as Martha Foster
 Henry O'Neill as Judge Ben Hobbs
 Darryl Hickman as Larry Price
 Nestor Paiva as Karl
 King Donovan as Peter Wolfe
 Charles Evans as Paul Norton
 Ernö Verebes as Mr. Cox
 Arlene Jenkins as Aileen
 Pepito Pérez as poster man
 Joey Ray as Tommy Ray
 Frank Mayo as committee man (uncredited)
 Lester Dorr as commercial fisherman (uncredited)

Release

Critical response
A 1949 review of the film in The New York Times notes that, "Due to the fine acting and the wily direction, the story plays exceptionally well, but the script tends to be somewhat wobbly and indecisive upon reflection." Film4 commented on the leading man's performance, "Milland is outstanding as the personification of evil—a talent often obscured by his charm and early juvenile good looks."

Home media
Kino Lorber released a region A Blu-ray edition of the film through their Kino Lorber Studio Classics label on July 13, 2021.

See also
 Politics in fiction
 Ray Milland filmography

References

External links
 
 
 
 
 

1949 films
1940s fantasy drama films
American fantasy drama films
American black-and-white films
Films scored by Franz Waxman
Films directed by John Farrow
Paramount Pictures films
Works based on the Faust legend
1949 drama films
1940s American films